Hausen may refer to:

Places in Germany

Bavaria
Hausen, Miltenberg, in the Miltenberg district
Hausen, Lower Bavaria, in the Kelheim district
Hausen, Upper Franconia, in the Forchheim district
Hausen, Rhön-Grabfeld, in the Rhön-Grabfeld district
Hausen, Villenbach
Hausen, Greding, a locality in Greding, district of Roth
Hausen bei Würzburg, in the Würzburg district
Hausen bei Aindling, a locality of Aichach-Friedberg
Hausen bei Augsburg, a locality in Diedorf, district of Augsburg
Hausen bei Bad Kissingen, a locality in Bad Kissingen

Baden-Württemberg
, in Sigmaringen district, in the former Principality of Fürstenberg
Hausen am Tann, in Zollernalbkreis district
Hausen vor Wald, in Schwarzwald-Baar-Kreis district
Hausen im Wiesental, in Lörrach district
, in Heilbronn district on the Württemberger Weinstraße
Hausen an der Möhlin, Ortsteil of Bad Krozingen, Breisgau-Hochschwarzwald

Hesse
Hausen (Frankfurt am Main); a city district of Frankfurt am Main

North Rhine-Westphalia
Hausen, part of Heimbach in the district of Düren
Hausen, part of Neunkirchen-Seelscheid in the Rhein-Sieg district

Rhineland-Palatinate
Hausen (Wied), in the district of Neuwied
Hausen, Birkenfeld, in the district of Birkenfeld

Thuringia
Hausen, Thuringia, in the district of Eichsfeld

Places in Switzerland
Hausen, Meiringen, in the canton of Bern
Hausen am Albis, in the canton of Zurich
Hausen bei Brugg, in the canton of Aargau

Other places
Hausen (crater), crater on the moon

People with the name

Friedrich von Hausen ( 1155–1190), German poet
 Christian August Hausen (1693–1743), German mathematician
 Max von Hausen (1846–1922), German army officer
Ivan Hausen (1927–2003), Brazilian track and field athlete 
 Harald zur Hausen (born 1936), German virologist
 Peter Hausen (died 2012), German developmental biologist

See also 

pt:Hausen